Nassaria nebulonis is a species of sea snail, a marine gastropod mollusk in the family Nassariidae, the true whelks.

Description
The length of the shell attains 21.9 mm.

Distribution
This marine species occurs off Java, Indonesia.

References

 Fraussen K., Dharma B. & Stahlschmidt P. (2009). Recent and fossil: Nassaria nebulonis sp. nov. from Indonesia (Gastropoda: Buccinidae). Gloria Maris, 48(4-5): 83-90

External links

Nassariidae
Gastropods described in 2009